Joseph Kiwánuka, MAfr (June 25, 1899—February 22, 1966) was a Ugandan prelate of the Catholic Church. He served as Archbishop of Rubaga from 1960 until his death.

Biography 
Joseph Kiwánuka was born in Nakirebe, Mpigi District, to Catholic parents, Victoro Katumba Munduekanika and Felicitas Nankya Ssabawebwa Namukasa. Each day, Victoro and his family walked eight miles to Mass at the nearest mission station. He was sent to Mitala Maria Mission School in 1910, after a missionary, who had seen him reading a book, was favorably impressed by this ability. He graduated in 1914, whence he entered the minor seminary in. Kiwánuka where he found his vocation greatly tested but persevered nonetheless. He then joined the Major Seminary of Katigondo, where he excelled in philosophy, and sought to enter the Missionaries of Africa, more commonly known as the White Fathers, in 1923. However, Bishop Henri Streicher, the Apostolic Vicar of Uganda and himself a White Father, was against his decision. The Superior General of the White Fathers at the time finally agreed to admit Kiwánuka after his ordination.

He was ordained to the priesthood by Bishop Streicher on May 26, 1929. Streicher then sent the young priest to Rome to study canon law, in an attempt to prevent him from entering the White Fathers' novitiate, which had invited Kiwánuka in July of that year. In Rome, Kiwánuka studied at the Pontifical University of St. Thomas Aquinas, Angelicum, from where he later obtained his doctorate in canon law, with a dissertation on marriage.

He finally entered the novitiate of the White Fathers in Algeria on October 8, 1932, becoming a full member of the congregation nearly a year later, on October 12, 1933. Upon his return to Uganda in 1933, he did pastoral work in Bikira and Bujuni, and taught at the Katigondo Seminary.

On May 25, 1939, a day before the tenth anniversary of his priestly ordination, Kiwánuka was appointed the first Apostolic Vicar of Masaka and Titular Bishop of Thibica by Pope Pius XII. He received his episcopal consecration on the following October 29 from Pope Pius himself, with Archbishops Celso Costantini and Henri Streicher, MAfr, serving as co-consecrators, in St. Peter's Basilica. Kiwánuka was thus made the first native African bishop. He visited the United States in 1950.

He was later given the title of Bishop upon his apostolic vicariate's elevation to a diocesan see on March 25, 1953. During his tenure, the Bishop faced challenges from Muslims, once saying, "Both African and Asian Muslims in the diocese accumulate wealth and slowly extend their influence. Their wealth, plus polygamy, enables them to win many young Catholic girls". He was opposed by African nationalists as well, many of whom viewed Christianity as belonging to Western culture.

Bishop Kiwanuka was active in public affairs, both as a behind-the-scenes advisor to political leaders and as an active participant.  in the early 1950s a major political crisis led to the exiling of the King of Buganda by the British colonial governor. The crisis was settled by the Namirembe Conference, in which Bishop Kiwanuka participated.  This conference negotiated a new constitutional monarchy for Buganda. (reference:  Must we lose Africa, by Colin Legum)

On December 20, 1960, Kiwánuka was promoted to Archbishop of Rubaga. He attended the Second Vatican Council from 1962 to 1965, during the course of which he assisted Pope Paul VI in the canonization of the Uganda Martyrs on October 18, 1964. His last great act was issuing a pastoral letter on political leadership and democratic maturity during the governmental crisis of President Milton Obote. He was considered likely to have been elevated to a cardinal.

The Archbishop died shortly afterwards, at the age of 66. He is buried in the metropolitan cathedral of Rubaga.

References

External links 
 
 

1899 births
1966 deaths
White Fathers priests
20th-century Roman Catholic archbishops in Uganda
Ugandan expatriates in Italy
Participants in the Second Vatican Council
Ugandan expatriates in Algeria
Roman Catholic bishops of Masaka
Roman Catholic archbishops of Kampala